Ryan Hunter (born April 1, 1995) is a Canadian gridiron football offensive lineman for the Toronto Argonauts of the Canadian Football League (CFL). He has also been a member of the Kansas City Chiefs and Los Angeles Chargers of the National Football League (NFL).

Amateur career
Hunter is from North Bay, Ontario. He moved to Buffalo, New York, during high school. He attended Canisius High School, and played for the school's football team. He was named the best offensive lineman in Western New York, and shared 2012 The Buffalo News Player of the Year Award with teammate Qadree Ollison.

Hunter then attended Bowling Green State University, and played college football for the Bowling Green Falcons. He took a redshirt in his first year, and then played in 52 games for his next four years. He started all 12 games of his junior year at right tackle, and all 12 games in his senior year at left tackle.

Professional career
After not getting selected in the 2018 NFL Draft, Hunter was drafted by Toronto Argonauts as the final pick (9th overall) of the first round of 2018 CFL Draft but did not sign a contract with the team.

Kansas City Chiefs
Instead, Hunter signed with the Kansas City Chiefs as an undrafted free agent. Hunter spent the 2018 season on the Chiefs' practice squad. He was promoted to the active roster in 2019. After a loss, the Chiefs released Hunter, but they re-signed him to the practice squad. He was again promoted to the active roster, and was on the active roster for Super Bowl LIV in which the Chiefs beat the San Francisco 49ers 31-20. He was waived during final roster cuts on September 5, 2020.

Los Angeles Chargers
On October 1, 2020, Hunter was signed to the Los Angeles Chargers practice squad. He signed a reserve/future contract with the Chargers on January 5, 2021.

On August 31, 2021, Hunter was waived by the Chargers and re-signed to the practice squad the next day. He signed a reserve/future contract with the Chargers on January 11, 2022.

On August 30, 2022, Hunter was waived by the Chargers.

Toronto Argonauts
On September 23, 2022, it was announced that Hunter had signed with the Toronto Argonauts. He was a member of the 109th Grey Cup champions.

References

External links
Toronto Argonauts bio
Bowling Green bio

1995 births
Living people
American football offensive guards
Bowling Green Falcons football players
Canadian players of American football
Kansas City Chiefs players
Los Angeles Chargers players
Sportspeople from North Bay, Ontario
Toronto Argonauts players